"Haven't You Heard" may refer to:

 "Haven't You Heard" (Patrice Rushen song), a 1980 song by Patrice Rushen
 "Haven't You Heard" (Shirley Myers song), a 1998 song by Shirley Myers
 "Haven't You Heard", a 1998 song by Jeff Buckley from his posthumous compilation album Sketches for My Sweetheart the Drunk
 Haven't You Heard... a 2011 album by LBC Crew

See also 

 Have You Heard? (disambiguation)